The Divine Word College of Calapan also referred to by its acronym DWCC is a private Catholic basic and higher education institution run by the Philippine Central Province of the Society of the Divine Word in Calapan, Oriental Mindoro, Philippines. It was established by the Divine Word Missionaries in April 1946 and was then called Mindoro Junior College until January 1981. The academic programs offered on its first year of operation were normal education, liberal arts, pre-law, including short term courses in typing and stenography (July 1, 1946).

Model Students

History
The Divine World College of Calapan, as a Catholic institution of higher learning, goes back to the missionary work of Fr. Benito Rixner, SVD and other missionaries of the Society of the Divine Word in Mindoro. Mindoro Junior College, as the school was first called, was established in April 1946. The formal opening of classes in first year Normal Education, Liberal Arts, Pre-Law, and special short-term courses in Typing and Stenography was on July 1, 1946. There were thirty-seven students as first enrollees.

The first floor of the old bishop's residence was used for classrooms by the students and ten (10) faculty members. The biggest room served as library with around a thousand volumes coming from other SVD schools and the rest from donations. The regular residence rooms were used as classrooms while the smallest room became the Registrar's Office. Athletic activities were held at the church plaza.

In 1953, Fr. Albert Cook, SVD who was the Director then, constructed a two-storey building on a lot purchased adjacent to the two original structures. Construction was completed just in time for the school year 1953–1954. By that time, there were just three buildings being housing about a thousand students until around 1964.

From 1954 through 1964, enrolment increased steadily and, through the efforts of Bishop William Duschak, SVD, DD, who went to Europe to ask for donations from friends and benefactors, the dream of a modern college in a spacious compound materialized.

During the school year 1964–1965, all classes were moved to the new campus. About the same time, the Elementary Department was inaugurated by virtue of the Temporary Permit No. 96. In 1975, the President, Fr. Eleuterio S. Lacaron, SVD, also introduced the School Campaign Program.

In 1976, permission was granted by the Ministry of Education, Culture and Sports (MECS) for the revival of the Graduate School Program which was phased out in 1972. Meanwhile, the college curriculum was further diversified with the inclusion of the short- term courses and the offering of traditional fields of concentration in the degree programs.

In 1980, the course in Master in Business Administration (MBA) was offered by virtue of Temporary Permit No.132, s. 1985 dated July 1980 with forty-seven (47) students and three (3) professors. Recognition was granted in June 1985, signed by the Minister of Education, Culture and Sports, Jaime C. Laya.

In January 1981, the name of the college was changed from Mindoro Junior College to Divine Word College of Calapan - making it more identified with the educational apostolate of the Society of the Divine Word in the province of Oriental Mindoro.

In 1987, the Divine Word College of Calapan was granted Level II accreditation for five (5) years by the Philippine Accrediting Association of Schools, Colleges and Universities (PAASCU). On April 2, 1993, another Level II accreditation was granted, and a re-accreditation in 1998.

A non-degree program in Computer Science was opened during the administration of Fr. Joel L. Maribao, to give the youth of Mindoro and its neighboring provinces the opportunity to learn the new technology. The Associate in Computer Data Processing (ACDP) was recognized during the school year 1994–1995, while the two-year course in Computer System and Business Management (CSBM) was given Permit No. TV-P 059, s. 1994.

In 1995, the Civil Engineering Department was acknowledged as Top 1 in Region IV and Top 10 at the National Level credited to the high percentage of its board passers. This was published in the Philippine Star on June 13, 1995.

Another honor was received by DWCC as per CHED Memorandum No. 76, s. 1995, when DWCC was selected as Center for Excellence in Teacher Education for Region IV. It was also during the time of Fr. Eleuterio S. Lacaron, SVD (1994–1995), that DWCC was named Institute of Local Government Academy (ILGA) in Oriental Mindoro by the Department of Interior and Local Government (DILG).

During the administration of Fr. Romeo P. Bancale, SVD, the DWCC Graduate School was granted permit to offer two (2) new graduate programs, Master in Public Administration and Doctor of Philosophy in Management, by virtue of the Government Recognition Nos. 27 and 28, s. 1997, made effective in the school year 1997–1998. It was also in that same year that the High School Department moved out from the main campus to the Janssen campus located in Pachoca, Calapan. The campus has been renamed Freinademetz Campus.

In 2000, during the term of Fr. Ernesto F. Vitor, SVD, government permits were granted to offer Bachelor of Science in Office Administration, Bachelor of Science in Tourism, and Bachelor of Science in Hotel and Restaurant Management, including associate courses in Office Administration, Tourism, and HRM using the ladderized curriculum.

In 2002, the Elementary Department building located adjacent to the High School Department building at the Freinademetz campus was completed. In the succeeding year, the Elementary Department transferred to its new site, thus housing together the Basic Education Department in that campus.

Another milestone for the institution was again achieved when the DWCC-SIFE team of the Student In Free Enterprise (SIFE) was acclaimed the national champion in the SIFE National Exposition held at the Holiday Inn, Manila in February 2002. Later, the said team represented the country in the prestigious SIFE World Cup in Amsterdam, The Netherlands, in September of the same year. In 2005, Jose Lemuel Dimaunahan topped the November 2005 Electronics and Communications Engineering board examination while Heidi Libed topped the 2005 Licensure Examination for Teachers in Region IV.

The year 2006 marked the 60th founding anniversary of the Divine Word College of Calapan. Themed ‘Word in a Changing World’, DWCC, under the administration of Fr. Nielo M. Cantilado, SVD, renewed its commitment to continue to provide quality education.

Pursuant to its thrust in research, DWCC launched the Center for Mindoro Studies in July 2006. As a resource center, the Center for Mindoro Studies focuses on the cultural heritage of Mindoro and helps promote respect for the indigenous culture of the Mangyans. As a center for research, it aims to organize a repository of research and historical materials relevant to the studies of parochial schools, parishes, and municipalities in the provinces of the Island of Mindoro.

In the second semester of school year 2006–2007, assisted by the Technical Education and Skills Authority (TESDA), and under the auspices of President Gloria Macapagal Arroyo scholarship programs, DWCC began offering certificate courses in Contact Center Agent Training, Medical Transcription, and Commercial Cooking.

Academics

College departments
 Accountancy Department
 Business and Hospitality Management Department
 Computer Studies Department
 Engineering, Architecture and Fine Arts
 Education Department
 Liberal Arts and Criminology Department

Graduate courses
 Doctor of Philosophy in Management (PhD)
 M.A. in education (MAEd)
Major in:
 Administration and Supervision
 English Language Teaching
 English Literature
 Filipino
 Mathematics
 Science Education
 Social Science Teaching
 Master in Business Administration (MBA)
 Master in Public Administration (MPA)

Degree courses
 Bachelor of Science in Accountancy
 Bachelor of Science in Accounting Technology
 Bachelor of Science in Architecture
 Bachelor of Science in Computer Science
 Bachelor of Science in Information Technology
 Bachelor of Science in Information System
 Bachelor of Science in Computer Engineering
 Bachelor of Science in Civil Engineering
 Bachelor of Science in Electronics and Communications Engineering
 Bachelor of Science in Hotel and Restaurant Management
 Bachelor of Science in Office Administration
 Bachelor of Science in Tourism Management
 Bachelor of Science in Business Administration
Major in: Marketing Management, Business Economics, Operations Management and Financial Management
 Bachelor of Science in Criminology
 Bachelor of Arts
Political Science
Psychology
English Language
 Bachelor of Science in Elementary Education
Early Childhood Education
General Educ
 Bachelor of Science in Secondary Education
English
Filipino
Mathematics
MAPEH
Physical Sciences
Biological Sciences
Values Education
 Teaching Certificate

TESDA/TVET
 Finishing Course for Call Center Agents (100 hours)
 Contact Service Center/Call Center Course (300 hours)

Activities

The DWCC Gazette
The DWCC Gazette is the official student publication of DWCC, published twice every semester. The publication is known for its outstanding performance in numerous inter-scholastic competitions in the Philippines, particularly in Region IV-B and the Mimaropa region.

Departments
 News
 Opinion/editorial
 Features
 Literary
 Development and communications
 Sports
 Comics

Katha Literary Folio
Katha, an acronym for Kalipunan ng mga Akdang Tumatalakay sa mga Hinaing ng mga Aba, is the official literary folio of the DWCC Gazette published once a year, released between November and February.

The word katha is an old Tagalog word for "creation."

Comics
The DWCC Gazette's center-fold comics is a popular staple depicting semestral activities.

The comics is often shown with a black and white sketch of the college, including the two large buildings that comprise the campus, namely the Main Building and the Academic (ACD) Building.

Students and characters are portrayed by caricatures characterized by big faces and small bodies made alive by dialogues taken from current school events.

Awards and recognitions
 Sep 2003 - Overall Champion, first Mimaropa Higher Education Press Conference
 Sep 2004 - Overall Champion, second Mimaropa Higher Education Press Conference
 2006 - Best Tabloid Award, 14th CEGP Regional Press Conference 2006
 Nov 2007 - Best Newsletter, fourth Regional Higher Education Press Conference
 Nov 2007 - second Place, Best Tabloid Award, fourth Regional Higher Education Press Conference
 Nov 2007 - second Over-all Winner, fourth Regional Higher Education Press Conference
 Jan 2009 - second Over-all Winner, fifth Regional Higher Education Press Conference
 Feb 2010 - Overall Champion, sixth Mimaropa Higher Education Press Conference
 Feb 2010 - Best Broadsheet, ninth Luzonwide Higher Education Press Conference
 Dec 2012 - Best Tabloid, Mimaropa Higher Education Press Conference

Campuses
The Divine Word College of Calapan is housed in three campuses: two campuses in Calapan and the other in Pinamalayan, Oriental Mindoro.
 College Departments and Administrative Offices:  Janssen Campus, Sta. Maria Village, Calapan 
 Basic Education Departments:  Freinademetz Campus, Tibag, Calapan; Pinamalayan.

See also
Divine Word Academy of Dagupan – Rizal Ext., Dagupan, Pangasinan
Divine Word College of Bangued – Bangued, Abra
Divine Word College of Laoag – Gen. Segundo Ave., Laoag, Ilocos Norte
Divine Word College of Legazpi – Rizal Street, Legazpi, Albay
Divine Word College of San Jose – San Jose, Occidental Mindoro
Divine Word College of Urdaneta – Urdaneta, Pangasinan
Divine Word College of Vigan – Vigan, Ilocos Sur
Divine Word University (DWU) – Tacloban, Leyte; closed in 1995, re-opened as Liceo del Verbo Divino

References

External links
 Divine Word College of Calapan Online Community

Universities and colleges in Oriental Mindoro
Catholic universities and colleges in the Philippines
Catholic elementary schools in the Philippines
Divine Word Missionaries Order
Education in Calapan